The 15th Critics' Choice Awards were presented on January 15, 2010 at the Hollywood Palladium, honoring the finest achievements of 2009 filmmaking. The ceremony was broadcast on VH1 and hosted by Kristin Chenoweth. The nominees were announced on December 14, 2009.

The awards expanded this year from 16 to 24 film categories, adding seven technical categories and separating its screenplay category into adapted and original slots, to more closely mirror the Academy Awards.

The World War II epic Inglourious Basterds and romantic musical drama Nine both received a record 10 nominations each, which was unprecedented at the time. Both films received numerous nominations in the awards' new craft categories, benefiting from the recent expansion of the categories. In the following years, this record has been broken several times. Avatar followed close behind with nine nominations and won the most awards of the night with a record-breaking six wins.

Winners and nominees

Joel Siegel Award
Kevin Bacon

Best Picture Made for Television
Grey Gardens
 Gifted Hands: The Ben Carson Story
 Into the Storm
 Taking Chance

Statistics

References

2009 film awards
Broadcast Film Critics Association Awards